is a railway station in Aibetsu, Kamikawa, Hokkaidō Prefecture, Japan. Its station number is A38.

Lines
Hokkaido Railway Company
Sekihoku Main Line

Adjacent stations

References
 

Railway stations in Hokkaido Prefecture
Railway stations in Japan opened in 1922